= Production Engineering Jadavpur University =

This department was established in Jadavpur University by Late Prof. Amitava Bhattacharyya in 1980. This "Center of Excellence" at Jadavpur University has earned national and international reputation especially during the late 1980s. The department, with its state of the art engineering labs and modernized courses, offers specialized training in manufacturing and production that cater to the growing requirements of the manufacturing industry around the globe.
